The 2031 Rugby World Cup is scheduled to be the twelfth edition of the Rugby World Cup, the quadrennial world championship for men's rugby union teams. It is scheduled to take place in the United States, tentatively from September to October of 2031. This will be the first time the tournament is held in the Americas.

Host nation selection

The United States officially launched their bid to host the 2027 or 2031 Rugby World Cup in October 2021, while in February the same year, England, Wales, Scotland and Ireland had considered a joint bid to host the 2031 edition. At the time, the United States was the only bidder for the 2031 Rugby World Cup and the following month (November 2021) were in an “exclusive targeted dialogue” with World Rugby with regard to hosting the 2031 edition.  

In April 2022, President Joe Biden sent a letter of support to World Rugby affirming his support for the bid. On May 12, 2022, World Rugby announced the United States had won the bid to host the 2031 Rugby World Cup.

Development and preparations

Possible expansion
The possibility of expanding the number of teams from twenty to twenty-four has been proposed. A final decision of expansion will be up to World Rugby.

Dates
The Rugby World Cup typically takes place from September to October. In the United States, this would overlap with the 2031 NFL season and the 2031 Major League Soccer season. As many of the proposed venues are NFL stadiums and Major League Soccer stadiums, there is the possibility of the tournament being held during the summer months (June–September) to avoid clashing with the both leagues' schedules. However, a determination of scheduling is yet to be made.

Candidate host cities
A total of 24 cities have been shortlisted for the 2031 Rugby World Cup. Shortlisted cities include Atlanta, Austin, Baltimore, Birmingham, Boston, Charlotte, Chicago, Dallas, Denver, Houston, Kansas City, Los Angeles, Miami, Minneapolis, Nashville, New York City, Orlando, Philadelphia, Pittsburgh, Phoenix, San Diego, San Francisco, Seattle and Washington, D.C.. Most of the proposed venues are NFL stadiums, with a number of MLS stadiums in the running as well. Among the 24 cities which are under consideration, 11 of them have been selected as host cities for the 2026 FIFA World Cup.

Qualifying

The below table shows the qualified teams as of 28 April 2022:

See also
 2033 Rugby World Cup
 Rugby World Cup hosts

References

2031 in rugby union
2031
World Cup 2031
 
2031 in the United States
Rugby union in the United States
International rugby union competitions hosted by the United States
World Cup